Julian Stanford (born September 2, 1990) is an American football linebacker who is a free agent. He played college football at Wagner College and was signed by the Jacksonville Jaguars as an undrafted free agent in 2012. He has also played for the Detroit Lions, Tampa Bay Buccaneers, New York Jets, and Buffalo Bills.

Professional career

Jacksonville Jaguars
Stanford signed with the Jacksonville Jaguars following the 2012 NFL Draft as a rookie free agent. He was released on August 30, 2013.

Detroit Lions
On December 3, 2013, Stanford signed with the Detroit Lions. He was cut by the Lions on September 6, 2015.

Tampa Bay Buccaneers
After working out for the team Stanford signed to the Buccaneers practice squad on September 16, 2015. On September 22, 2015, he was released from practice squad. On October 28, 2015, he was re-signed to the practice squad. On November 3, 2015, he was waived.

New York Jets
On December 1, 2015, Stanford was signed to the Jets' practice squad and was re-signed on January 5, 2016. He was released on September 26, 2016 and re-signed to the practice squad the next day. He was promoted back to the active roster on October 22, 2016. He was waived by the Jets on December 7, 2016 and placed on injured reserve.

On April 14, 2017, Stanford was released by the Jets but was re-signed three days later.

Buffalo Bills
On March 14, 2018, Stanford signed with the Buffalo Bills.

Carolina Panthers
After becoming a free agent in March 2020, Stanford visited the Houston Texans on August 16, and had a tryout with the Carolina Panthers on August 19. On August 22, 2020, Stanford was signed by the Panthers.

On May 18, 2021, Stanford re-signed with Carolina, and was a core special teamer for the team in 2021. He re-signed again with the Panthers on March 9, 2022. He was placed on injured reserve on August 30, 2022. He was released on October 11.

Baltimore Ravens
Stanford signed to the Baltimore Ravens squad on October 18, 2022. He was released on December 19.

Detroit Lions (second stint)
On January 3, 2023, Stanford was signed to the Detroit Lions practice squad.

References

External links

 Wagner profile

1990 births
Living people
American football linebackers
Buffalo Bills players
Carolina Panthers players
Detroit Lions players
Jacksonville Jaguars players
New York Jets players
Wagner Seahawks football players
Bloomfield High School (Connecticut) alumni
People from Bloomfield, Connecticut
Sportspeople from Hartford County, Connecticut
Players of American football from Connecticut